Sean Storey (born 19 August 1971 in Scunthorpe, Lincolnshire, England) is a former English professional snooker player.

His best ranking performance to date came in the World Championship in 2003, where he defeated Joe Perry before bowing out in the last 16, losing 7–13 to John Higgins. Previously he had qualified for the World Championship in 2001, but lost 10–9 to Joe Swail after leading 9–7. His best season was 2002/03 when he won 28 matches overall - the most out of anyone on the tour. He suffered a drop in form in the following season, winning just three matches (although he was now entering tournaments at a later stage). Having been provisionally as high as #26 during the 2003/2004 season, he ended up at #50, and dropped to #68 a year later.

His best ranking  to date was a 145 in the 2001 British Open. In 1997, Storey became the first cueist to compile two maximum breaks in the same pro-am tournament. In the 2004/5 season, he picked up £13,650 in prize money.

Storey is most famous for being the first player to beat Ronnie O'Sullivan in a professional match. On 2 August 1992, Storey ended O'Sullivan's record of 38 consecutive match wins in ranking events. Storey won 5–3 in the sixth round of qualifying in the British Open.

References

External links

 Profile on World Snooker

English snooker players
Living people
1971 births
Sportspeople from Scunthorpe